Zdenko Verdenik (born 2 May 1949) is a Slovenian football manager and former player.

He coached NK Olimpija, Slovenia under-21 team, Slovenia senior team, FK Austria Wien, JEF United Ichihara, Nagoya Grampus Eight, Vegalta Sendai, and Omiya Ardija.

Managerial statistics

References

External links
Profile at Austria Vienna archives

1949 births
Living people
People from Ptuj
Yugoslav footballers
Association football wingers
NK Svoboda Ljubljana players
NK Železničar Maribor players
Yugoslav football managers
Slovenian football managers
Slovenia national football team managers
NK Olimpija Ljubljana (1945–2005) managers
FK Austria Wien managers
Expatriate football managers in Japan
Slovenian expatriate sportspeople in Japan
J1 League managers
J2 League managers
JEF United Chiba managers
Nagoya Grampus managers
Vegalta Sendai managers
Omiya Ardija managers
Slovenian expatriate football managers